Richard Reid is a former Ulster unionist politician.

Reid worked as a farmer in Pomeroy, County Tyrone.  An evangelical Protestant, he became friendly with Norman Porter, secretary of the National Union of Protestants.  In 1950, he arranged a meeting at the town courthouse for Monica Farrell, and through this, became acquainted with Ian Paisley.  He subsequently joined Paisley's Free Presbyterian Church of Ulster, and, although there was no local congregation, he became a church elder.

In 1975, Reid stood for Paisley's Democratic Unionist Party in Mid Ulster, and was elected to the Northern Ireland Constitutional Convention.  He was also elected to Cookstown District Council at the 1977 Northern Ireland local elections.

From the 1980s on, Reid withdrew from formal politics, but he was active in the Orange Order, where he became known as a leading traditionalist during the Drumcree conflict.

References

Year of birth missing (living people)
Living people
Members of Cookstown District Council
Democratic Unionist Party politicians
Members of the Northern Ireland Constitutional Convention
Farmers from Northern Ireland
People from County Tyrone